In Greek mythology, Acarnan (Ancient Greek: Ἀκαρνάν; genitive Ἀκαρνᾶνος derived from ἀκαρνάν akarnan 'laurel' or 'thistle') was son of Alcmaeon and Callirrhoe, and brother of Amphoterus.

Mythology 
Alcmaeon was murdered by Phegeus (or, in some sources, his sons Agenor and Pronous), when they were yet very young, and Calirrhoe prayed to Zeus to make her sons grow quickly, that they might be able to avenge the death of their father. The prayer was granted, and Acarnan with his brother slew Phegeus, his wife, and his two sons. The inhabitants of Psophis, where the sons had been slain, pursued the murderers as far as Tegea, where however they were received and rescued. At the request of Achelous they carried the necklace and peplos of Harmonia to Delphi, and from thence they went to Epirus, where Acarnan founded the state called after him Acarnania.

In Apollodorus' Bibliotheca, Book III.7.5-7 recounts the adventure of Acarnan and his brother Amphoterus to avenge their father Alcmaeon:

 Being apprized of Alcmaeon's untimely end and courted by Zeus, Callirrhoe requested that the sons she had by Alcmaeon might be full grown in order to avenge their father's murder. And being suddenly full-grown, the sons went forth to right their father's wrong. Now Pronous and Agenor, the sons of Phegeus, carrying the necklace and robe to Delphi to dedicate them, turned in at the house of Agapenor at the same time as Amphoterus and Acarnan, the sons of Alcmaeon; and the sons of Alcmaeon killed their father's murderers, and going to Psophis and entering the palace they slew both Phegeus and his wife. They were pursued as far as Tegea, but saved by the intervention of the Tegeans and some Argives, and the Psophidians took to flight. Having acquainted their mother with these things, they went to Delphi and dedicated the necklace and robe according to the injunction of Achelous. Then they journeyed to Epirus, collected settlers, and colonized Acarnania.

Notes

References 
 Apollodorus, The Library with an English Translation by Sir James George Frazer, F.B.A., F.R.S. in 2 Volumes, Cambridge, MA, Harvard University Press; London, William Heinemann Ltd. 1921. ISBN 0-674-99135-4. Online version at the Perseus Digital Library. Greek text available from the same website.
Graves, Robert, The Greek Myths, Harmondsworth, London, England, Penguin Books, 1960. 
Graves, Robert, The Greek Myths: The Complete and Definitive Edition. Penguin Books Limited. 2017. 
Publius Ovidius Naso, Metamorphoses translated by Brookes More (1859-1942). Boston, Cornhill Publishing Co. 1922. Online version at the Perseus Digital Library.
Publius Ovidius Naso, Metamorphoses. Hugo Magnus. Gotha (Germany). Friedr. Andr. Perthes. 1892. Latin text available at the Perseus Digital Library.
Strabo, The Geography of Strabo. Edition by H.L. Jones. Cambridge, Mass.: Harvard University Press; London: William Heinemann, Ltd. 1924. Online version at the Perseus Digital Library.
Strabo, Geographica edited by A. Meineke. Leipzig: Teubner. 1877. Greek text available at the Perseus Digital Library.
Thucydides, The Peloponnesian War. London, J. M. Dent; New York, E. P. Dutton. 1910. Online version at the Perseus Digital Library. Greek text available from the same website.

Characters in Greek mythology
Ancient Acarnania
Mythology of Argos